The 1989 Soviet football championship was the 56th seasons of competitive football in the Soviet Union. Spartak Moscow won the Top League championship becoming the Soviet domestic champions for the twelfth time.

Honours

Notes = Number in parentheses is the times that club has won that honour. * indicates new record for competition

Soviet Union football championship

Top League

First League

Second League (finals)

Group 1

Group 2

Group 3

Top goalscorers

Top League
 Sergei Rodionov (Spartak Moscow) – 16 goals

First League
Valeriy Masalitin (CSKA Moscow) – 32 goals

References

External links
 1989 Soviet football championship. RSSSF